The Lamar Cardinals baseball team represents Lamar University and competes in the Southland Conference of the NCAA's Division I after officially rejoining the conference on July 11, 2022. The team is coached by head coach, Will Davis following Jim Gilligan's retirement at the end of the 2016 season.  Except for five seasons (1987–1991), the Cardinals baseball team had been coached by Jim Gilligan since 1973. With over 1000 career wins as a head coach, Gilligan was one of the most winning coaches in NCAA history.

The Cardinals baseball team leads the Southland Conference with 10 regular season titles. The Cardinals also won one Sun Belt Conference regular season title in 1993.  In addition, the Cardinals have won three Southland Conference tournament titles and two Sun Belt Conference tournament titles. In the 2010 season, the Lamar was seeded seventh in the Southland Conference baseball tournament, went undefeated through the tournament, and was crowned the conference champions. The team received a bid to the 2010 NCAA Division I baseball tournament and played TCU and Baylor.  Over the years, the Cardinals have appeared in the NCAA Division I Baseball Championship tournament thirteen (13) times.

Coaches

NCAA Division II

Lone Star Conference

JB Higgins (1952–1954)
(Baseball was discontinued from 1955–1966.)

NCAA Division I

Southland Conference

Bob Frederick (1967–1968)
Bill Vincent (1969–1972)
Jim Gilligan (1973–1986)

American South Conference

David Perkins (1988–1991)

Sun Belt Conference

Jim Gilligan (1992–1998)

Southland Conference

Jim Gilligan (1999–2016)
Will Davis   (2017–present)

Lamar career coaching records

(Records reflect game results through May 27, 2022.)

Year-by-year results
Information Source:

(Records reflect game results through May 27, 2022.)

Lamar Cardinals in the NCAA tournament
The NCAA Division I baseball tournament started in 1947.
The format of the tournament has changed through the years.

Conference Tournaments
Sources:

Major League Baseball

Players in the Majors
Many Lamar players have gone on to play in Major League Baseball.

Clay Hensley
Kevin Millar
Eric Cammack
Brian Sanches
Jerald Clark
Phil Brassington
Micah Hoffpauir
Beau Allred
Dave Smith
Tony Mack
Bruce Aven
Randy Williams

Players drafted by Major League teams
Lamar has had 90 Major League Baseball Draft selections since the draft began in 1965.

See also
List of NCAA Division I baseball programs

References

External links
 

 
Baseball teams established in 1952
Baseball teams in Beaumont, Texas
1952 establishments in Texas